Bolte may refer to:

Bolte Bridge, large twin Cantilever bridge in Melbourne, Victoria, Australia
Charles L. Bolte (1895–1989), U.S. Army general and World War I and World War II veteran
Henry Bolte GCMG (1908–1990), Australian politician, Premier of Victoria
Jill Bolte Taylor (born 1959), neuroanatomist specializing in postmortem investigation of the human brain